Daliborka Vilipić (Serbian Cyrillic: Дaлиборкa Вилипић, born 30 March 1975 in Banja Luka, SFR Yugoslavia) is a Serbian female basketball player.

See also 
 List of Serbian WNBA players

External links
Profile at eurobasket.com

1975 births
Living people
Sportspeople from Banja Luka
Serbian women's basketball players
Serbian expatriate basketball people in Cyprus
Serbian expatriate basketball people in Italy
Serbian expatriate basketball people in Israel
Serbian expatriate basketball people in Hungary
Serbian expatriate basketball people in the United States
Serbian expatriate basketball people in Poland
Centers (basketball)
Los Angeles Sparks players
Serbs of Bosnia and Herzegovina
Women's National Basketball Association players from Serbia
ŽKK Crvena zvezda players